Browns Well Highway is a road connecting Loxton, South Australia through the Murray Mallee to Pinnaroo in South Australia. It was named in 2008 after the Browns Well district for areas traversed by the highway.

Railways were evenly spaced across the Mallee before road transport improved. The Browns Well highway crosses the Loxton railway line on the outskirts of the town, the former Barmera railway line at Paruna about 34 km along the route, and the former Peebinga railway line 64 km along the route. It crosses the Pinnaroo railway line in Pinnaroo near the southern terminus of the highway. These all provided reliable transport to pioneer settlers in the region, including transporting grain and produce through Tailem Bend to markets.

Major intersections

References

Highways in South Australia
Murray Mallee